Mitchell William Stout (February 24, 1950 – March 12, 1970) was a United States Army soldier and a recipient of the United States military's highest decoration—the Medal of Honor—for his actions in the Vietnam War.

Biography
Stout joined the Army from Raleigh, North Carolina in August 1967. By March 12, 1970, was serving as a Sergeant in Battery C, 1st Battalion, 44th Artillery Regiment. On that day, at Khe Gio Bridge in the Republic of Vietnam, Stout picked up an enemy-thrown grenade and used his body to shield his comrades at the expense of his own life.

Stout, aged 20 at his death, was buried in Virtue Cemetery, Concord, Tennessee.

Medal of Honor citation
Sergeant Stout's official Medal of Honor citation reads:

Sgt. Stout distinguished himself during an attack by a North Vietnamese Army Sapper company on his unit's firing position at Khe Gio Bridge. Sgt. Stout was in a bunker with members of a searchlight crew when the position came under heavy enemy mortar fire and ground attack. When the intensity of the mortar attack subsided, an enemy grenade was thrown into the bunker. Displaying great courage, Sgt. Stout ran to the grenade, picked it up, and started out of the bunker. As he reached the door, the grenade exploded. By holding the grenade close to his body and shielding its blast, he protected his fellow soldiers in the bunker from further injury or death. Sgt. Stout's conspicuous gallantry and intrepidity in action, at the cost of his own life, are in keeping with the highest traditions of the military service and reflect great credit upon him, his unit and the U.S. Army.

Other
The gym on main post Fort Bliss is named in his honor.

SGT Stout is the only US Army Air Defense Artillerymen to earn the Medal of Honor.

See also

List of Medal of Honor recipients
List of Medal of Honor recipients for the Vietnam War

Notes

References

1950 births
1970 deaths
American military personnel killed in the Vietnam War
United States Army Medal of Honor recipients
People from Knoxville, Tennessee
United States Army non-commissioned officers
Vietnam War recipients of the Medal of Honor
Deaths by hand grenade
United States Army personnel of the Vietnam War